Two destroyers of the Imperial Japanese Navy have been named :

Imperial Japanese Navy ship names
Japanese Navy ship names